Colus jeffreysianus is a species of sea snail, a marine gastropod mollusk in the family Colidae, the true whelks and the like.

Description
The length of the shell attains 58.3 mm.

Distribution
This species occurs in the North Sea, the North Atlantic Ocean and in the Mediterranean Sea.

References

 Fischer P. (1868). Note sur les espèces du genre Fusus qui habitent les côtes océaniques de la France. Journal de Conchyliologie 16: 35-38
 Iredale T. (1918-1921). Molluscan nomenclatural problems and their solution. Proceedings of the Zoological Society of London part 1, (1918) 1-2: 28-40 [agosto] part 2, (1921) 2
 Gofas, S.; Le Renard, J.; Bouchet, P. (2001). Mollusca, in: Costello, M.J. et al. (Ed.) (2001). European register of marine species: a check-list of the marine species in Europe and a bibliography of guides to their identification. Collection Patrimoines Naturels, 50: pp. 180–213
 Marshall J. T. (1901-1902). Additions to British Conchology. Part VI. Journal of Conchology, 10: 122-128 [October 1901]; 190-193
 Hayward, P.J.; Ryland, J.S. (Ed.). (1990). The marine fauna of the British Isles and North-West Europe: 1. Introduction and protozoans to arthropods. Clarendon Press: Oxford, UK. . 627 pp

External links
 Jeffreys J. G. (1877). New and peculiar Mollusca of the Eulimidae and other families of Gastropoda, as well as of the Pteropoda, procured in the Valorous expedition. Annals and Magazine of Natural History, (4)19: 317–339
 Fischer P. (1882-1883). Diagnoses d'espèces nouvelles de mollusques recueillis dans le cours des expéditions scientifiques de l'aviso "Le Travailleur" (1880 et 1881). Journal de Conchyliologie 30: 49-53 [1882, 273-277]
 Jeffreys, J. G. (1877). New and peculiar Mollusca of the Eulimidae and other families of Gastropoda, as well as of the Pteropoda, procured in the Valorous expedition. Annals and Magazine of Natural History. (4)19: 317-339.
 Alder J. (1848). Catalogue of the Mollusca of Northumberland and Durham. Transactions of the Tyneside Naturalist's Field Club (1848): 97-209
 Locard A. (1897-1898). Expéditions scientifiques du Travailleur et du Talisman pendant les années 1880, 1881, 1882 et 1883. Mollusques testacés. Paris, Masson. vol. 1 [1897, p. 1-516 pl. 1-22; vol. 2 [1898], p. 1-515, pl. 1-18.]
 Sars, M. (1859). Bidrag til en skildring af den arktiske molluskfauna ved Norges nordlige kyst. Forhandlinger i Videnskabs-Selskabet i Christiania. (1858): 34-87
 Locard A. (1896) Mollusques testacés et brachiopodes, pp. 129-242, pl. 5-6, in: Koehler R. (1896) Résultats scientifiques de le campagne du "Caudan" dans le Golfe de Gascogne. Annales de l'Université de Lyon, 26
  Serge GOFAS, Ángel A. LUQUE, Joan Daniel OLIVER,José TEMPLADO & Alberto SERRA (2021) - The Mollusca of Galicia Bank (NE Atlantic Ocean); European Journal of Taxonomy 785: 1–114

Colidae
Gastropods described in 1868